Catalanotto (pronounced ca-ta-lan-na-toe) is an Italian surname. Notable people with the surname include:

Frank Catalanotto (born 1974), American baseball player and coach
Peter Catalanotto (born 1959), American book illustrator

Italian-language surnames